Lurgan is a town in County Armagh, Northern Ireland, near the southern shore of Lough Neagh. It had a population of about 31,000 (38,198 District Area) at the 2021 UK census and is within the Armagh, Banbridge and Craigavon district. For some purposes, Lurgan is treated as part of the "Craigavon Urban Area" along with neighbouring Craigavon and Portadown.

Lurgan is characteristic of many Plantation of Ulster settlements, with its straight, wide planned streets. It is the site of a number of historic listed buildings including Brownlow House and Lurgan Town Hall. Lurgan Park is the largest urban park in Northern Ireland.

Historically the town was known as a major centre for the production of textiles (mainly linen) after the Industrial Revolution, and it continued to be a major producer of textiles until that industry steadily declined in the late 20th century.

The development of the 'new city' of Craigavon had a major impact on Lurgan in the 1960s when much industry was attracted to the area.

History

The name Lurgan is an anglicisation of the Irish name An Lorgain. This literally means "the shin", but in placenames means a shin-shaped hill or ridge (i.e. one that is long, low and narrow). Earlier names of Lurgan include Lorgain Chlann Bhreasail (anglicised Lurganclanbrassil, meaning "the long low ridge of Clanbrassil") and Lorgain Bhaile Mhic Cana (anglicised Lurganvallivackan, meaning "the long low ridge of McCann's settlement"). The Mac Cana (McCanns) were a sept of the O'Neills and Lords of Clanbrassil before the Plantation of Ulster in the early 17th century.

About 1610, during the Plantation and at a time when the area was sparsely populated by Irish Gaels, the lands of Lurgan were granted to the English lord William Brownlow and his family. Initially the Brownlow family settled near the lough at Annaloist, but by 1619, on a nearby ridge, they had established a castle and bawn for their own accommodation, and "a fair Town, consisting of 42 Houses, all of which are inhabited with English Families, and the streets all paved clean through also to water Mills, and a Wind Mill, all for corn."

Brownlow became MP for Armagh in the Irish Parliament in 1639. During the Irish Rebellion of 1641, Brownlow's castle and bawn were destroyed, and he and his wife and family were taken prisoner and brought to Armagh and then to Dungannon in County Tyrone. The land was then passed to the Mac Cana clan and the O'Hanlons. In 1642,
Brownlow and his family were released by the forces of Lord Conway, and as the rebellion ended they returned to their estate in Lurgan. William Brownlow died in 1660, but the family went on to contribute to the development of the linen industry which peaked in the town in the late 17th century.

Theobald Wolfe Tone would often pass through Lurgan on his journeys, writing in 1792 "Lurgan green as usual".

The Great Famine
A workhouse was built in Lurgan and opened in 1841 under the stipulations of the Poor Law which stated that each Poor Law Union would build a workhouse to give relief to the increasing numbers of destitute poor. In 1821 the population of Lurgan was 2,715, this increased to 4,677 by 1841. There were a couple of reasons for this large growth in population. Firstly the opportunities provided by the booming linen industry led many to abandon their meagre living in rural areas and migrate to Lurgan in the hope of gaining employment. Secondly the ever-expanding town gave tradesmen the opportunity to secure work in the construction of new buildings such as Brownlow House.

The large numbers of poor workers migrating to the town inevitably resulted in over-crowding and a very low standard of living. When the potato crop failed for a second time in 1846 the resulting starvation led to a quickly overcrowded workhouse which by the end of 1846 exceeded its 800 capacity. In an attempt to alleviate the problem a relief committee was established in Lurgan as they were in other towns. The relief committees raised money by subscription from local landowners, gentry and members of the clergy and were matched by funds from Dublin. With these monies food was bought and distributed to the ever-increasing numbers of starving people at soup kitchens. In an attempt to provide employment and thereby give the destitute the means to buy food, Lord Lurgan devised a scheme of land- drainage on his estate.

The so-called 'famine roads' were not built in Lurgan to the same extent as the rest of Ireland, although land owners also provided outdoor relief by employing labourers to lower hills and repair existing road. During the period 1846 to 1849 the famine claimed 2,933 lives in the Lurgan Union alone. The Lurgan workhouse was situated in the grounds of what is now Lurgan Hospital and a commemorative mural can be seen along the adjacent Tandragee Road.

New city

The town grew steadily over the centuries as an industrial market town, and in the 1960s, when the UK government was developing a programme of new towns in Great Britain to deal with population growth, the Northern Ireland government also planned a new town to deal with the projected growth of Belfast and to prevent an undue concentration of population in the city. Craigavon (a name unpopular with the Nationalist community) was designated as a new town in 1965, intended to be a linear city incorporating the neighbouring towns of Lurgan and Portadown. The plan largely failed, and today, 'Craigavon' locally refers to the rump of the residential area between the two towns. The Craigavon development, however, did affect Lurgan in a number of
ways. The sort of dedicated bicycle and pedestrian paths that were built in Craigavon were also incorporated into newer housing areas in Lurgan, additional land in and around the town was zoned for industrial development, neighbouring rural settlements such as Aghacommon and Aghagallon were developed as housing areas, and there was an increase in the town's population, although not on the scale that had been forecast.

The textile industry remained a main employer in the town until the late twentieth century, with the advent of access to cheaper labour in the developing world leading to a decline in the manufacture of clothing in Lurgan.

The Troubles

Lurgan and the associated towns of Portadown and Craigavon made up
part of what was known as the "murder triangle"; an area known for a significant number of incidents and fatalities during The Troubles. By 2010 the town was one of the few areas in Northern Ireland where so-called dissident republicans have a significant level of support. The legacy of the Troubles is continued tension between Roman Catholics and Protestants, which has occasionally erupted into violence at flashpoint 'interface areas'.

On 5 March 1992, a 1,000 lb truck bomb, believed to have been planted by the IRA, exploded in Main Street causing mass damage to commercial properties.

On 5 February 2020, the PSNI found a bomb on a lorry. The Continuity Irish Republican Army admitted they had planted it. They expected the lorry to be put on a North Channel ferry in January 2020.

Geography
Lurgan sits in the north-eastern corner of County Armagh in a relatively flat part of Ireland by the south east shore of Lough Neagh, on the border with County Down and less than 2 miles from the border of County Antrim. The two main formations in north Armagh are an area of estuarine clays by the shore of the lough, and a mass of basalt farther back. The earliest human settlements in the area were to the northwest of the present day town near the shore of the lough. When the land was handed to the Brownlow family, they initially settled near the lough at Annaloist, but later settled where the town was eventually built. The oldest part of the town, the main street, is built on a long ridge in the townland (baile fearainn) of Lurgan. A neighbouring hill is the site of Brownlow House, which overlooks Lurgan Park.

Townlands
Like the rest of Ireland, the Lurgan area has long been divided into townlands, whose names mostly come from the Irish language. Lurgan sprang up in the townland of the same name. Over time, the surrounding townlands have been built upon and they have given their names to many roads and housing estates. The following is a list of townlands within Lurgan's urban area, alongside their likely etymologies:

Shankill parish:
 Aghnacloy
 Ballyblagh (from Baile Bláthach meaning "flowery townland")
 Demesne (an English name – this townland was carved out of Drumnamoe and others, and includes Lurgan Park)
 Derry (from Doire meaning "oak grove")
 Dougher (formerly Doucharron, probably from An Dubhcharn, Dúcharn meaning "the black cairn")
 Drumnamoe (from Druim na mBó meaning "ridge of the cows")
 Knocknashane (formerly Knocknashangan, from Cnoc na Seangán meaning "hill of the ants")
 Lurgantarry (from Lurgain an tSamhraidh meaning "summer ridge" or "ridge of the summer grazing")
 Shankill (from Seanchill meaning "old church" or Seanchoill meaning "old wood")
 Taghnevan (formerly Tegnevan, from Teach Neamhain meaning "Neamhan's house" or "Neamhan's church")
 Tannaghmore North & Tannaghmore South (from an Tamhnach Mór meaning "the big grassy field")
 Toberhewny (from Tobar Shuibhne meaning "Sweeney's well" or Tobar Chainnigh meaning "Cainneach's well")
 Tirsogue (from Tír Sídheóg meaning "land of the fairies")

Seagoe parish:
 Ballynamony (from Baile na Mónadh meaning "townland of the bog")
 Drumnakelly (from Dromainn Uí Cheallaigh meaning "O’Kelly's ridge")
 Silverwood (an English name – formerly called Killinargit, from Coill an Airgid meaning "wood of the silver")
 Turmoyra (from Tír Maighre meaning "land of the salmon")

Climate
Lurgan has a temperate climate in common with inland areas in Ireland. The consistently humid climate that prevails over Ireland can make temperatures feel uncomfortable when they stray into the high 20s °C (80–85 °F), more so than similar temperatures in hotter climates in the rest of Europe.

Governance 
Lurgan is part of the Upper Bann constituency for the purpose of elections to the UK Parliament at Westminster.  This has long been a safe unionist seat and the current MP is Carla Lockhart of the Democratic Unionist Party.

Members of the Northern Ireland Assembly at Stormont are elected from six-member constituencies using proportional representation and using the same constituencies as for Westminster.

Lurgan town commissioners were first elected in 1855, and they were replaced by Lurgan Urban District Council following the Local Government (Ireland) Act 1898. This effectively ended landlord control of local government in Ireland.  The town council was abolished when local government was reformed in Northern Ireland in 1973 under the Local Government (Boundaries) Act (Northern Ireland) 1971 and the Local Government Act (Northern Ireland) 1972. These abolished the two-tier system of town and county councils replacing it with the single-tier system. Lurgan was placed under the jurisdiction of Craigavon Borough Council, and remained so until a new act streamlined and merged the various districts in 2015. Today Lurgan forms part of the new Armagh, Banbridge and Craigavon District. The Lurgan area contains the following wards: Church, Donaghcloney, Knocknashane, Magheralin, Mourneview, Parklake, and Waringstown.

Seven councillors are elected to represent the Lurgan electoral area on the Armagh City, Banbridge and Craigavon Borough Council. The councillors for the DEA are:

Demography

For census purposes, Lurgan is not treated as a separate entity by the Northern Ireland Statistics and Research Agency (NISRA). Instead, it is combined with Craigavon, Portadown and Bleary to form the "Craigavon Urban Area". A fairly accurate population count can be found by combining the data of the electoral wards that make up the Lurgan urban area. These are Church, Court, Drumnamoe, Knocknashane, Mourneview, Parklake, Taghnevan and Woodville.

On the day of the last census (21 March 2021) the combined population of these wards was 31,068. The latest religious data published is from 2011 with an estimated population of 25,069 (27 March 2011) Of this population:
 62.2% were from a Catholic background, and 33.7% were from a Protestant or other Christian background

The town is divided along ethnic/political/sectarian lines with entire housing areas being almost exclusively Nationalist/Catholic/Irish or almost exclusively Unionist/Protestant/British. The north end of the town centre is considered Nationalist/Catholic, the south end is considered Unionist/Protestant, with the "invisible dividing line" starting at the end of Market Street and the beginning of High Street at Windsor Avenue and Union Street.  In the 1980s there were two Unionist/Protestant enclaves in the north end of the town, Gilpinstown and Wakehurst. They have both since changed to become Nationalist/Catholic areas as Unionists/Protestants gradually moved out.

There was a Synagogue at 49 North Street for the Lurgan Hebrew Congregation, founded prior to 1906 by Joseph Herbert (originally Herzberg) from Tukums in Latvia, but this closed in the 1920s around the time of the founder's death.

Economy
Lurgan has historically been an industrial town in which the linen industry predominated as a source of employment during the Industrial Revolution, and is said to have employed as many as 18,000 handloom weavers at the end of the 19th century, a figure significantly higher than the town's resident population at the time. That particular branch of the textile industry declined as consumer tastes changed, but other textiles continued to be produced in the town providing a major source of employment until the 1990s and 2000s when the textile industry across the UK suffered a major decline as a result of outsourcing to low wage countries.

The large Goodyear fan-belt factory at Silverwood Industrial Estate was a product of the Craigavon development when large tracts of land in Lurgan, Portadown, and areas in between were zoned off for exclusive industrial use. The Goodyear factory closed in 1983 after failing to make a profit, resulting in the loss of 750 jobs. The facility was later partly occupied by Wilson Double Deck Trailers and DDL Electronics. Silverwood Industrial Estate continues to host other manufacturing and light engineering firms. Other industrial areas in the town are Annesborough and Halfpenny Valley (Portadown Road) industrial estates; areas in which growth has been limited compared to other industrial estates in the Craigavon Borough.

A key component of the Craigavon development was a central business district halfway between Lurgan and Portadown that would serve as the city centre for the whole of the new city.  What was built was an office building, a court house, a civic building, and a small shopping centre alongside several acres of parkland that were developed around the newly created balancing lakes that also serve as part of the area's drainage system. In the 1990s, the shopping centre was significantly expanded to form what is now Rushmere Retail Park, containing many major retail stores. This has had a detrimental effect on the retail trade in Lurgan in the same way that out-of-town shopping developments in other parts of Northern Ireland have damaged other traditional town centres. The town's Chamber of Commerce is not functioning and has remained dormant despite numerous attempts to revive it.

Culture and community

Cultural references
There is a figure of speech used in Ireland – to have a face as long as a Lurgan spade – meaning "to look miserable". The origins of this expression are disputed. One theory is that a "Lurgan spade" was an under-paid workman digging what is now the Lurgan Park lake. Another theory is that it could be from the Irish language lorga spád meaning the shaft (literally "shin") of a spade.

The ballad Master McGrath concerns a greyhound of that name from Lurgan which became an Irish sporting hero. The dog was bought in Lurgan by the Brownlow family, and the song also mentions his owner Charles Brownlow, referred to in the lyrics as Lord Lurgan. Master McGrath won the Waterloo Cup hare coursing competition three times in 1868, 1870 and 1871 at a time when this was a high-profile sport. A post mortem found that he had a heart twice the size of what is normal for a dog of his size. He is remembered all over the town, including in its coat of arms. The dog was named McGrath after the kennel boy responsible for its care. A statue of him was unveiled at Craigavon Civic Centre in 1993, over 120 years after his last glory in 1871. The statue was relocated to Lurgan town centre in 2013. A festival is also held yearly in his honour. A Lurgan pub is also named after Master McGrath.

The town is a frequent recipient of derision by the BBC Northern Ireland comedy panel show The Blame Game.

Community facilities
Oxford Island is a nature reserve on the shore of Lough Neagh that includes Kinnego Marina and the Lough Neagh Discovery Center, which is an interpretive visitor centre offering information about the surrounding wildlife, conference facilities, and a café.

Lurgan Park, a few hundred yards from the main street, is the largest urban park in Northern Ireland and the second-largest in Ireland after Phoenix Park, Dublin. It used to be part of the estate of Brownlow House, a 19th-century Elizabethan-style manor house. In 1893, the land was purchased by Lurgan Borough Council and opened as a public park in 1909 by Earl Aberdeen, Lord Lieutenant of Ireland. It includes a sizeable artificial lake and an original Coalbrookdale fountain. Today the park is home to annual summer events such as the Lurgan Agricultural Show, and the Lurgan Park Rally, noted as the largest annual motor sport event in Northern Ireland and a stage in the Circuit of Ireland rally.
Mount Zion House in Edward St, formerly the St Joseph's Convent, is now a cross-community centre run by the Shankill Lurgan Community Association/Community Projects. It is funded by the Department for Social Development, the EU Special Programme for Peace and Reconciliation, and the Physical and Social Environment Programme.

Landmarks

Lurgan town centre is distinctive for its wide main street, Market Street, one of the widest in Ireland, which is dominated at one end by Shankill (Anglican) Church in Church Place. A grey granite hexagonal temple-shaped war memorial sits at the entrance to Church Place, topped by a bronze-winged statue representing the spirit of Victorious Peace. A marble pillar at the centre displays the names of over 400 men from the town who lost their lives in the First World War.

The rows of buildings on either side of Market Street are punctuated periodically by large access gates that lead to the space behind the buildings, gates that are wide enough to drive a horse and cart through. The town's straight planned streets are a common feature in many Plantation towns, and its industrial history is still evident in the presence of many former linen mills that have since been modified for modern use.

At the junction of Market Street and Union Street is Lurgan Town Hall, a listed building erected in 1868. It was the first site of the town's library in 1895, was temporarily used as a police station from 1973 and is today available for conferences and community functions.

Brownlow House, known locally as 'Lurgan Castle', is a distinctive mansion built in 1833 with Scottish sandstone in an Elizabethan style with a lantern-shaped tower and prominent array of chimney pots.  It was originally owned by the Brownlow family, and today is owned by the Lurgan Loyal Orange District Lodge. A former lodge to the Brownlow House estate became the Brownlow Arms Hotel on Market Street, run by the McCaffrey family, which served as the US 5th Army's Officers' Mess during WW2 but closed in the early 1960s. The adjacent Lurgan Park, now a public park owned by Craigavon Borough Council, used to be part of the same estate. The park is the venue for the Lurgan Park Rally.

Religious sites

The site of what is now Shankill cemetery served as a place of worship over the centuries. It began in ancient times as a simple double ring fort, the outline of which is still noticeable, and is today an historic burial site holding the remains of people who lived in the earliest days of the town's existence, including the Brownlow family.  Dougher cemetery is another old graveyard that was donated to the Catholic people by the Brownlows following passage of the Catholic Relief Act.

The two most prominent modern places of worship are Shankill Parish Church in Church Place and St Peter's Church in North Street, the steeples of which are visible from far outside the town.

Shankill Parish Church belongs to the Anglican Church of Ireland. The original church was established at Oxford Island on the shore of Lough Neagh in 1411, but a new church was built in Lurgan on the site of what is now Shankill Cemetery in 1609 as the town became the main centre of settlement in the area. It was eventually found to be too small given the growth of the town, and the Irish Parliament granted permission to build a replacement in 1725 one mile away on the 'Green of Lurgan', now known as Church Place, where it stands to this day. It is believed to be the largest parish church in Ireland, and contains the only set of change ringing bells in County Armagh.

Following passage of the Catholic Relief Act, Charles Brownlow granted a site to the Roman Catholic parish priest the Reverend William O'Brien in 1829 for the construction of a church on Distillery Hill, now known as lower North Street. It was there that work began in 1832 on what is now St Peter's Church.

In 1966, another Catholic church, St Paul's, was built at the junction of Francis Street and Parkview Street. This was a radical departure from traditional church architecture with its grey plaster finish, copper roof, slim spire, hexagonal angles and modern design throughout. Many of its architectural features such as the copper roof and gray plaster finish are shared by the neighbouring St Paul's School. It was designed to cope with the extra demand for worship space following the growth of the surrounding Taghnevan and Shankill housing estates.

The first Methodist church was built in Nettleton's Court, Queen Street in 1778.  It was found to be too small and a new church was built on High Street in 1802, and replaced by a newer building in front of it in 1826. This High Street Mehtodist Church was extensively renovated in 1910 and stands to this day sporting a simple facade.

Education
It was the late 19th century that saw the development of formal education in Lurgan and a significant move away from the less organised hedge schools of before.

Today, schools in Lurgan operate under the Dickson Plan, a transfer system in north Armagh that allows pupils at age 11 the option of taking the 11-plus exam to enter grammar schools, with pupils in comprehensive junior high schools being sorted into grammar and non-grammar streams. Pupils can get promoted to or demoted from the grammar stream during their time in those schools depending on the development of their academic performance, and at age 14 can take subject-based exams across the syllabus to qualify for entry into a dedicated grammar school to pursue GCSEs and A-levels.

As is common in Northern Ireland, most of the schools in Lurgan are attended mainly by children from one or other of the two main ethno-religious blocs, reflecting the existence of deep-seated ethnic, sectarian and political divisions in society. Some schools are in the Catholic 'maintained' sector, i.e. maintained by the Council for Catholic Maintained Schools, and others are controlled directly by the state. Directly controlled state schools generally have a predominantly Protestant intake.

Primary education
 Lurgan Model Primary School (Controlled) - this school was part of the national schools programme proposed in 1831 in which each county in Ireland would have at least one school that would serve as an example to other national schools in the area and as a teacher training establishment (although teacher training did not take place at this particular school). Initially it had a multi-denominational intake, offered such services as night classes and industry-relevant vocational courses, and was enthusiastically supported by William Brownlow who is thought to have brought the school to the town. It was undermined, however, by church interests, which were opposed to its lack of ecclesiastical control, and criticism of the efficiency of its management, hence losing much of its earlier prestige as the premier educational establishment in the town. It is now co-educational, non-denominational and accepts pupils irrespective of race or religion.

 St. Francis' Primary School and Bunscoil Naomh Proinsias (Catholic Maintained)
 St Teresa's Primary School (Catholic Maintained)
 St Anthony's Primary School (Catholic Maintained)
 Tannaghmore Primary School (Catholic Maintained)
 Tullygally Primary School (Catholic Maintained)

 Carrick Primary School (Controlled)
 Dickson Primary School (Controlled)
 King's Park Primary School (Controlled)

Post-primary education
 Lurgan College - a co-ed 14–18 grammar school, was established in 1873 as an all-boys school to provide what was known as 'classical education' as opposed to the more practical vocational education on offer at the Model School. Its initial charter included a provision that "no person being in Holy Orders, or a minister of any religious denomination shall at any time interfere in the management of the said school, or be appointed to serve as master" and that no religious instruction was to take place during school hours. 

 St Ronan's College - A co-ed secondary school for 11-18 year olds. It was formed from the merger of St Mary's Junior High School, St Paul's Junior High School, and St Michael's Grammar School. St Mary's Intermediate School was built on Kitchen Hill after land was acquired from the Sisters of Mercy in 1955 and was opened in 1959 as an all-girls school. The nearby all-boys St Paul's Intermediate School was opened in 1962.  

Lurgan Junior High School - A co-educational 11-14 High School.

A number of people from Lurgan also attend Lismore Comprehensive School and Brownlow Integrated College in Craigavon.

 Southern Regional College - Lurgan Technical College was renamed Lurgan College of Further Education, and subsequently merged with Portadown CFE and Banbridge CFE into the larger Upper Bann Institute of Further and Higher Education (UBIFHE). Further education in the region was consolidated further when this institution was merged with other FE colleges in Armagh, Newry and Kilkeel to form the Southern Regional College.  It offers vocational courses as an alternative to A-Levels, and adult education services.

Special needs education
Ceara School provides education for pupils aged 3 through 19 who have severe learning difficulties.

Sport and leisure

Facilities
Lurgan has two 18-hole golf courses, an artificial ski slope and an equestrian centre for show jumping.

GAA
Lurgan has a large GAA presence, with Gaelic football being played by clubs Clan na Gael CLG, Clann Éireann GAC, Éire Óg CLG, Sarsfields GAC (Derrytrasna), St Mary's GAC (Aghagallon), St Michael's GAC (Magheralin), St Paul's GFC, St Peter's GAC and Wolfe Tone GAC, Derrymacash. There is also a well-respected girls camogie club at Clann Éireann, and boys hurling club Seán Treasy's, which has been amalgamated at a youth level with Portadown's St Malachy's, to create North Armagh Hurling.

Football
The town is home to NIFL Premiership club Glenavon, established in 1889 and based at Mourneview Park. In 1952, Glenavon became the first club outside Belfast to win the Irish League title, and picked up a further two titles in 1957 and 1960. NIFL Premier Intermediate League club Dollingstown play at nearby Planters Park.

Lurgan also has a strong footballing scene in the lower leagues, with clubs such as Lurgan Town, Oxford Sunnyside and Craigavon City representing the area in the intermediate divisions of the Mid-Ulster Football League, while Derryhirk United, Hill Street, Lurgan BBOB and Goodyear play in the junior divisions.

Lurgan Celtic previously played in the NIFL Championship and Premier Intermediate League, but following financial difficulties, the club resigned from league football on 15 August 2019, and will resume senior activities from Mid-Ulster Junior Division 3 for the 2020–21 season.

Other sport

Boxing is a common sport amongst children and adults of all ages and gender, with clubs such as South Paw Boxing and Fitness club and The Fitness Factory being popular choices.

Cricket has two clubs, Lurgan Cricket Club and Victoria Cricket Club. Rugby union is played by Lurgan RFC, who share their Pollock Park ground with Lurgan Cricket Club.

Tennis is played by Lurgan Tennis Club which is in Lurgan Park. Lurgan Golf Club is an 18-hole challenging parkland course bordering on Lurgan lake.

The Lurgan Park Rally, inaugurated in 1980, was one of the largest motorsport events on the island of Ireland. However, the event has been on hiatus since 2017.

Lawn Bowls. Lurgan Park is home to Lurgan Bowling Club who field teams in the NIBA,the NIWBA and the Veterans leagues.

Railway links
Lurgan railway station opened by the Ulster Railway on 18 November 1841, connecting the town to Belfast Great Victoria Street in the east and Portadown and Armagh in the west. The Great Northern Railway of Ireland provided further access to the west of Ulster which was then closed in the 1950s and 1960s from Portadown railway station.

Presently Lurgan railway station is run by Northern Ireland Railways with direct trains to Belfast Great Victoria Street and as part of the Dublin-Belfast railway line.

Railway access at Sydenham links into George Best Belfast City Airport on the line to Bangor.

Road transport and public services

Lurgan is situated by the M1 motorway connecting the town to Belfast. Bus services, provided by Translink, arrive and depart on a regular basis from bus stops on Market Street to Belfast, Portadown, Armagh, Dungannon, and surrounding areas.

Electricity is supplied by Northern Ireland Electricity which was privatised in 1993 and is now a subsidiary of ESB Group. The gasworks used to be in North St., but there is no longer any town gas since it was abolished in Northern Ireland in the 1980s by the Thatcher government for being uneconomical, although it was restored to the greater Belfast area in 1996. Water is supplied by Northern Ireland Water, a public owned utility.

Media
Lurgan is served by two weekly local newspapers. The Lurgan Mail, published by Johnston Publishing (NI), reports news and sport from around the local area. The 'Lurgan and Portadown Examiner' which reported local news and sport was owned by Observer Newspapers NI Ltd, based in Dungannon. This business closed in 2017 and the newspaper ceased publication.

Notable people

Living people

 Jocelyn Bell Burnell (born 1943) - Northern Irish astrophysicist,  discovered the first radio pulsars.
 Barry Douglas (born 1960) - classical pianist and conductor; has residences in Paris and Lurgan.
 Jim Harvey (born 1958) - Lurgan-born professional footballer;  assistant manager of the Northern Ireland football team; played for Glenavon, Arsenal and Tranmere Rovers.
 Geraldine Heaney (born 1967) - Lurgan-born Canadian women’s ice hockey player and Olympic gold medallist.
 Gayle Williamson (born 1980) - Miss Northern Ireland 2002; and Miss United Kingdom 2002
 Neil Lennon (born 1971) - football player and manager
 Jonathan Magee (born 1972) - academic and former footballer

Deceased people
 Edward Costello (1887-1916) - took part in the Easter Rising in April 1916, received a fatal bullet wound to the head on 25 April and died in Jervis Street Hospital, Dublin.
 John Cushnie (1943-2009) - broadcaster and panellist on BBC Radio 4 show Gardeners' Question Time; presented BBCNI TV show The Greenmount Garden.
 Field Marshal Sir John Dill (1881–1944) - British commander in World War I and World War II; later a diplomat; born in Lurgan
 William McFadzean (1895–1916) - soldier; died when he threw himself on a box of primed grenades prior to the Battle of the Somme and was awarded the Victoria Cross.
 Len Ganley (1943-2011) - MBE, a world championship snooker referee; was a resident of the town.
 Billy Hanna (c. 1929–1975) - founder and first commander of the Ulster Volunteer Force's Mid-Ulster Brigade; native of Lurgan. He was shot dead outside his home in the Mourneview estate by members of his own organisation.
 Sammy Jones (1911–1993) - professional footballer who made over 100 appearances for Blackpool and received one cap for the Irish national team; born in Lurgan
 James Logan (1674–1751) - born in Lurgan; became an American colonial statesman and scholar, secretary to his friend William Penn, and was noted as a jurist, political philosopher, and botanist.
 Cecil Maguire (1930–2020) - Irish landscape and figurative artist.
 Richard McGhee (1851–1930) - Irish Protestant Nationalist home rule politician;  Land League and trade union activist; Member of Parliament (United Kingdom) for more than 20 years.
 Rosemary Nelson (1958–1999) - human rights solicitor; killed by a loyalist car bomb
 Martin O'Hagan (1950-2001) - journalist for Sunday World newspaper; murdered on 28 September 2001 in front of his wife near his own home in the town.
 George William Russell (1867–1935) - writer; wrote under pseudonym Æ; Anglo-Irish supporter of the nationalist movement in Ireland; critic, poet, painter, mystical writer, and was at the centre of a group of followers of theosophy in Dublin for many years.
 Philip Felix Smith (1825–1906) - soldier; recipient of the Victoria Cross; birth is recorded in the parish of Shankill at St. Peter's RC Church, Lurgan.
 Norman Uprichard (1928–2011) - goalkeeper who began his career playing Gaelic Football with St. Peter's GAC. His decision to sign for Glenavon cost him a league medal under the GAA's now-defunct 'Rule 27'. He was finally awarded his medal by St. Peter's in 2004. He went on to play for Swindon Town, Portsmouth and Southend United at club level, and won 18 caps for Northern Ireland at international level.

See also
 List of towns in Northern Ireland
 List of villages in Northern Ireland
 List of townlands in County Armagh

References

External links

 Craigavon Borough Council

Other links
 

 
Towns in County Armagh
Civil parish of Shankill, County Armagh
Townlands of County Armagh